MLB: The Show is a Major League Baseball video game series created and produced by San Diego Studio, a development team that is part of PlayStation Studios. The series has received critical and commercial acclaim, and since 2014 has been the sole MLB baseball simulation video game on the market.

The series debuted in 2006 with MLB 06: The Show for the PlayStation 2 and PlayStation Portable, following the MLB series from 989 Sports. There has been a new release in the series every year since 2006.

The series was released on PlayStation 2 from 2006's MLB 06: The Show through 2011's MLB 11: The Show and was available on the PlayStation 3 from MLB 07: The Show through MLB The Show 16. Portable versions of the series for either the PlayStation Portable or PlayStation Vita accompanied every entry from MLB 06: The Show  through MLB 15: The Show. The series started releasing on the PlayStation 4 with MLB 14: The Show.

After over two decades of exclusivity with PlayStation consoles, MLB: The Show ceased to be an exclusive PlayStation franchise, and was released on other console platforms, though the edition of the game at the time—MLB The Show 20—was a PlayStation 4 exclusive. MLB The Show 21 is the first title in the series to feature on the Xbox One and Xbox Series X/S, with those editions being co-published by MLB Advanced Media digitally. MLB The Show 22 is the first game of the series to be on a Nintendo console, released on the Nintendo Switch.

Gameplay
Gameplay simulates a typical game of baseball, with the player controlling an entire team or a select player. The player may take control of one of 30 Major League Baseball teams in any game mode and also is able to chose from 6 special team including NL and AL all star teams. (excluding Road to the Show) and use that team in gameplay. The Series has variable game modes in which a player takes control of a team for a single game, one season, or a franchise (multiple seasons).

Predecessors from 989 Sports

Games

Special Edition Covers

International Covers

Commentators

Reception and sales

References

Major League Baseball video games
Video game franchises
Sony Interactive Entertainment franchises